The Bière–Apples–Morges Railway (BAM) or Chemin de fer Bière-Apples-Morges, located in Switzerland, is a  railway with a total length of almost  which links the towns in its name and from a junction at Apples to the village of L’Isle. The company was renamed to Transports de la région Morges-Bière-Cossonay (MBC) to express its other activities, mainly in local and regional bus services. Furthermore the Funiculaire Cossonay–Gare–Ville is part of MBC since 2010, Before, MBC was contracted to operate it.

History
The communities in the area between Morges, on the shores of Lake Geneva, and Biere first got together to discuss a line connecting the lakeside, the towns in the area and the expanding army barracks at Biere, on 26 September 1875 when they also realised there would also be a traffic flow of forestry and agricultural produce. Five different routes were considered and in the end a compromise route was agreed in 1890 but it took a further four years before construction started. The line opened on 1 July 1895. The line from Apples to L'Isle was opened on 12 September 1896 but after three years it merged with the BAM. Originally the lines were steam worked and it was not until 1943 that the system was electrified, the main line from 10 May, the Apples to L’Isle line from 13 November.

The lines

It takes the passenger from Lake Geneva to the foothills of the Jura mountains. The route is a little circuitous and avoids any major climb, the maximum gradient being 1 in 28 (35.7 mm/m or 3.57%). This branch line faces towards Bière and any traffic from the Morges direction has to reverse to gain access. In more recent times a short  branch line has been built from a point about  prior to Bière to serve a Swiss army installation and this provides military traffic for the railway, in particular trains of tanks carried on standard gauge flat wagons mounted on metre gauge carrying trucks.

Pre-electrification
Built for the opening of the main line section the BAM possessed three tender locomotives of the type G 3/3. These were built by SLM, Works No's. 883, 884, and 885 in 1894. They gained a 4th locomotive from the Apples - L'Isle Railway which became No.4. This, again was a product of SLM being Works No. 999 and being completed in 1896. In 1921 it acquired a 5th locomotive, another SLM product, the former SBB-CFF-FFS-Brunigbahn G 3/3 number 109 (Works No. 1341) which became their number 6. This locomotive was sold to a sawmill in Biel/Bienne after electrification and is now preserved at the Blonay–Chamby Museum Railway. The 6th and final steam locomotive in the fleet, HG3/4 No.7, bought second-hand in 1941 from the Furka-Oberalp Railway, was again a product of the SLM, works No. 2417, built in 1914. The rack equipment was removed making it a class G3/4. On arrival of no. 7, the army requested that no. 2 be sent to Montbovon as a strategical reserve, from where it came back after the War, 1945, only to be scrapped. In the year of electrification, 1943, no. 4 was rebuilt as snow plough. No. 3 was scrapped in 1944. The remaining two locomotives, no. 1 and 7, were sold in 1946 to Voies ferrées du Dauphiné in France. (Note: There was no No.5 in the fleet list)

Locomotives and Rolling Stock
Metre Gauge

Standard Gauge

Retired vehicles, Metre Gauge

Abbreviations
 ACMV   Ateliers de constructions mécaniques de Vevey.
 BBC    Brown, Boveri & Cie
 FFA    Flug- und Fahrzeugwerke Altenrhein AG
 SAAS   Société Anonyme des Ateliers de Sécheron
 SIG    Schweizerische Industrie Gesellschaft (German for Swiss Industrial Society)
 SLM Swiss Locomotive and Machine Works, Winterthur.
 Travys Transports Vallée-de-Joux - Yverdon-les-Bains - Sainte-Croix S.A.
 YSteC Compagnie du Chemin de fer Yverdon - Ste-Croix

Services
Services are normally provided by electric railcars of class Be 4/4, hauling either voiture pilote (driving trailers), delivered in 1982 and built by ACMV/SAAS, or coaches, or both. The two modern Ge 4/4 locomotives deal with freight traffic, the most obvious difference to the MOB and RhB locomotives is the addition of standard gauge buffers for use with standard gauge wagons.

Livery
Livery is green/cream. Ex-Travys vehicles 15 and 54 started service sporting the YSteC red/cream livery. The two standard gauge shunting locomotives still sport their SBB red livery (at June 2010) and it is not known if they are to be repainted in BAM Green

Accident
A fatal accident took place on 27 October 1997 when a train heading towards Bière collided with a tractor at a level crossing near Bussy-sur-Morges.  The train derailed and crashed into a metal catenary support mast killing the train driver instantly.  Four injured passengers were taken to hospital.

Transfer traffic

The company also owns two Class Te III locomotives based on the standard gauge lines at Morge where they shunt traffic for the metre gauge lines and mount this into metre gauge carrier bogies "piggy-back" style. These are numbered 147 and 155 and were built by SLM/MFO.

The future
From December 2004 the BAM, along with TL, LEB, CarPostal Suisse and CFF became part of a joint fare system, called Mobilis Vaud.  This includes weekly, monthly and yearly passes.  From December 2009 this fare system will be extended to cover the Riviera and North Vaudois and in the following year to Nyon and Gland.  The final section in the jigsaw will be the inclusion of the Chablais Vaudois area.

See also 
 List of railway companies in Switzerland

References

Footnotes

Sources
Grandguillaume Michel et al., Voies étroites de la campagne vaudoise. BVA, Lausanne, 1986, 
Guy Bratt. "Metre Gauge in Canton Vaud", Continental Modeller, February 2008.

External links

 Chemin de fer Bière-Apples-Morges (BAM)

Metre gauge railways in Switzerland
Railway lines in Switzerland
BAM
Transport in the canton of Vaud